Polžanska Gorca is a settlement west of Sladka Gora and north of Polžanska Vas in the Municipality of Šmarje pri Jelšah in eastern Slovenia. The area was historically part of the Styria region. The municipality is now included in the Savinja Statistical Region.

References

External links
Polžanska Gorca at Geopedia

Populated places in the Municipality of Šmarje pri Jelšah